Anne Maria Chapman (13 January 1791 – 12 December 1855) was an English Anglican missionary in New Zealand. She was born in Henley-on-Thames, Oxfordshire, England on 13 January 1791.

Chapman and her husband gave hospitality to early European explorers passing through on the route between Tauranga and the centre of the North Island. The most notable explorers and botanists who were assisted were John Carne Bidwell, Ernst Dieffenbach, and William Colenso.

In the second volume of J.D. Hooker's Flora Novae-Zelandiae (Flowerless Plants, 1855) there are records of the following seaweeds from "Maketu, Chapman": Ectocarpus, Polysiphonia, Champia, Nitophyllum, Plocamium, Gigartina, Ceramium, and Callithamnion. Anne Chapman may have played a part in collecting these.

Eponymy
 1855 Gigartina chapmanii. J.D. Hooker & W.H. Harvey in Harvey, W.H. Algae, Flora Novae-Zelandiae 2: 251. Maketu. Chapman.

References

1791 births
1855 deaths
English Anglican missionaries
English emigrants to New Zealand
People from Henley-on-Thames
19th-century New Zealand botanists
Anglican missionaries in New Zealand
Female Christian missionaries
New Zealand women botanists
Missionary botanists
19th-century New Zealand women scientists